The GOGBOT Festival is an annual four day festival in Enschede organized by Planetart, a local group of artists. It was first organized in 2004. The festival revolves around multimedia, art, music and technology and includes a three month exhibition in collaboration with the local Rijksmuseum (RMT), a four day exhibition during the festival, a symposium, a film program, and the Youngblood award for art academy graduates.

History 
The festival originates from several events that Planetart had previously organized in the city center of Enschede, i.e. in empty warehouses, in squares, in music venues, etc. Examples include the Gods must be Crazy, Op Drift, Sociale Dienst, RealAudio, Exploding Digita, and Astro Friezen. Both PlanetArt and GOGBOT were founded by creative director and artist Kees de Groot. Wilja Jurg was managing director from 2004 until 2007. She left to become director of the Enschede based artspace Tetem. Between 2007 and 2015 it was Viola van Alphen, who now works as independent curator. Between 2015 and 2022 Marie Janin, also director of the Sickhouse festival for art and gaming, filled the position. In 2021 Jeffrey Hofman joined the GOGBOT team as financial director.

International recognition 
Because of the accessible form and innovative approach, GOGBOT receives international recognition. Therefore, GOGBOT is invited for presentations including the ISEA in Singapore, Cellsbutton Indonesia, the Transmediale in Berlin, International Filmfestival Moscow, World Expo 2010, Japan Media Arts Festival 2011 and Techfest 2012. In 2011, the festival was awarded the National Innovation Award for being the most innovative festival in the Netherlands.

See also

List of electronic music festivals
List of experimental music festivals

References 
 Report GOGBOT 2009
 Mediaforum Catalogue
 ISEA
 BLEND magazine about GOGBOT 2 p.106
 Kunst critic Florian Cramer: there is one festival like a cyberpunk circus
 1000s articles on Pussy Riot Protest with Ina Shevchenko in Enschede 2012, first appearance of Ina Shevchenko in the Netherlands
 GOGBOT wins national price for being most innovative festival of the Netherlands, 2nd and 3rd are Lowlands en de Vervoering

External links 
 
 Site of the organizer: PLANETART

Arts festivals in the Netherlands
Political art
Experimental music festivals
DIY culture
Electronic music festivals in the Netherlands
Music festivals established in 2003
New media art festivals
Art festivals in the Netherlands